The 2018–19 Magyar Kupa (English: Hungarian Cup) was the 79th season of Hungary's annual knock-out cup football competition. MOL Vidi FC won the competition by beating Budapest Honvéd FC in the final held at Groupama Aréna on 25 May 2019.

Main Tournament
On 4 September the draw took place at the headquarters of the Hungarian Football Federation. This was the first draw in the 2018–19 season where Nemzeti Bajnokság I and Nemzeti Bajnokság II clubs were included.

Participating teams

Round of 128
A total of 128 teams participated in the 6th round of the Magyar Kupa. The new entrants were 12 clubs from the 2018–19 Nemzeti Bajnokság I, 20 clubs from the 2018–19 Nemzeti Bajnokság II, and 48 from the 2018–19 Nemzeti Bajnokság III.

Updated to games played on 11 May 2018

Round of 64
On 28 September 2018 the draw of the second round proper took place at the headquarters of the Hungarian Football Federation.

Note: Vác FC played their home match against MOL Fehérvár FC at Szusza Ferenc Stadion due to the reconstruction of their original home stadium, Ligeti Stadion.

Round of 32
On 31 October 2018 the draw of the second round proper took place at the headquarters of the Hungarian Football Federation.

Round of 16

1st leg
On 5 December 2018 the draw of the 9th round took place.

2nd leg

Quarterfinals
On 27 February 2019 the draw of the quarter finals took place at the studio of M4.

1st leg

2nd leg

Semifinals

1st leg

2nd leg

Final

Top scorers 
Bold text indicates players and teams who are still active in the competition.

See also
 2018–19 Nemzeti Bajnokság I
 2018–19 Nemzeti Bajnokság II
 2018–19 Nemzeti Bajnokság III

References

External links
 Official site 
 soccerway.com

Cup
Hungary
Magyar Kupa seasons